Shoot Straight is a 1923 comedy short film directed by Jay A. Howe and produced by Hal Roach Studios. It stars James Parrott (billed as "Paul Parrott") and Jobyna Ralston.

Plot 
An amateur hunter attempts to kill small game using his new weapon: a rifle with a fishing reel attached. However, after his hapless attempts at pursuing squirrels, rabbits, and fowl, he is eventually chased off by a bear.

References 

Hal Roach Studios short films
1923 short films
American comedy short films
American silent short films